Soffer is a surname. Notable people with the name include:

Adi Soffer (born 1987), Israeli footballer
Ariel David Soffer (born 1965), American cardiologist
Arnon Soffer (born 1935), Israeli geographer and professor
Avi Soffer (born 1986), Israeli soccer player
Bernard H Soffer, co-inventor of solid-state dye lasers
Donald Soffer (born 1933), American real estate developer
Jesse Lee Soffer (born 1984), American actor
Ram Soffer (born 1965), Israeli chess grandmaster
Sasson Soffer (1925–2009), American abstract painter and sculptor

Soffer also is a transliteration of the Hebrew word for Scribe.